Miluše Horská (born 26 April 1959) is a Czech pedagogue and politician who has been Senator representing Pardubice since 2010. She was elected to the Senate in 2010 Election as an independent candidate. In Senate is she member of KDU-ČSL (the Catholic Party) and independents group.

She is also a principal of Elementary and Practical school Svítání (means "sunrise" in Czech) in Pardubice,

She was re-elected in 2016 Senate election with 27,28% votes in first round and with 70,29% votes in second round. After this election she was elected to the post of 1st Vice-President of the Senate.

References

External links
Profile on the website of the Senate

1959 births
Living people
21st-century Czech women politicians
Members of the Senate of the Czech Republic
University of South Bohemia alumni
People from Humpolec